Carol Orzel (April 20, 1959 – February 2018) was an American woman with fibrodysplasia ossificans progressiva (FOP). She advocated for research into FOP and was an activist for disability rights. Before her death, she requested that her skeleton be displayed in the Mütter Museum.

Early life 
Orzel was born in Philadelphia in 1959 and diagnosed with FOP, a rare disease that causes tissue to ossify. In 1982 at age 23, she moved to Inglis House, a nursing-care facility, at its Belmont Avenue campus.

Advocacy and association with University of Pennsylvania 
After moving to Inglis House, Orzel became a patient of doctor Frederick Kaplan at the University of Pennsylvania. Kaplan had never before met someone with FOP, and the disease would become his focus. Orzel gave annual talks to incoming medical students at University of Pennsylvania to help them better understand treating people with disabilities. The Mütter Museum notes that she "advocated for more research, established networks of communication with others with FOP, and educated both the public and medical professionals about the disease." She was involved in the International FOP Association, or IFOPA, and cut the ribbon at the opening of UPenn's FOP Research Laboratory. It was this laboratory where the gene that causes FOP was discovered in 2006.

Donation of skeleton to Mütter Museum 

In 1995, Orzel saw the skeleton of Harry Eastlack, a famous patient of FOP, at an IFOPA conference. The skeleton was on loan from the Mütter Museum, and Orzel decided that after she died, she wanted her skeleton to be displayed with Eastlack's, on the condition that her jewelry was displayed too. When Orzel died at the Hospital of the University of Pennsylvania in 2018, Kaplan and executives from Inglis House contacted the Mütter Museum. Curator Anna Dhody oversaw the project. Due to the FOP and other illness, Orzel's body was very delicate and difficult to transport and prepare. Her body was transported from Philadelphia to Skulls Unlimited in Oklahoma City for processing. Orzel's skeleton and her jewelry went on display in the Mütter Museum in February 2019.

References

External links 

 Video about Orzel by the Mütter Museum

1959 births
2018 deaths
People from Philadelphia
American disability rights activists
Fibrodysplasia ossificans progressiva